The 2017 Cumbria County Council election took place on 4 May 2017 as part of the 2017 local elections in the United Kingdom. All 84 councillors were elected from electoral divisions which return one county councillor each by first-past-the-post voting for a four-year term of office.

Result summary

Results by electoral division

Allerdale District
(16 seats, 16 electoral divisions)

Aspatria

Bothel and Wharrels

Cockermouth North

Cockermouth South

Dearham and Broughton

Harrington

Keswick

Maryport North

Maryport South

Moss Bay and Moorclose

Seaton

Solway Coast

St John's and Great Clifton

St Michael's

Thursby

Wigton

Barrow-in-Furness

Dalton North

Dalton South

Hawcoat

Hindpool

Newbarns and Parkside

Old Barrow

Ormsgill

Risedale

Roosecote

Walney North

Walney South

Carlisle

Belah

Belle Vue

Botcherby

Brampton

Castle

Corby and Hayton

Currock

Dalston and Burgh

Denton Holme

Harraby North

Harraby South

Houghton and Irthington

Longtown

Morton

Stanwix Urban

Upperby

Wetheral

Yewdale

Copeland

Bransty

Cleator Moor East and Frizington

Cleator Moor West

Egremont

Egremont North and St Bees

Gosforth

Hillcrest and Hensingham

Howgate

Kells and Sandwith

Millom

Millom Without

Mirehouse

Eden

Alston and East Fellside

Appleby

Eden Lakes

Greystoke and Hesket

Kirkby Stephen

Penrith East

Penrith North

Penrith Rural

Penrith West

South Lakeland

Cartmel

Grange

High Furness

Kendal Castle

Kendal Highgate

Kendal Nether

Kendal South

Kendal Strickland and Fell

Kent Estuary

Lakes

Low Furness

Lower Kentdale

Lyth Valley

Sedbergh and Kirkby Lonsdale

Ulverston East

Ulverston West

Upper Kent

Windermere

By-elections between 2019 and 2021
The consultation on local reorganisation in Cumbria meant that Cumbria County Council elections did go ahead as planned in 2021. However, elections for the vacant seats on councils were held on Thursday 6 May 2021. These were - Brampton, Cockermouth North, St John's & Great Clifton and Ulverston West.

On 17 June 2020, a by-election of Corby & Hayton was announced after the resignation of Independent councillor William Graham. 
A by-election took place on 26 August to fill the vacant seat, and was won by the Liberal Democrats.

Brampton

Cockermouth North

St John's & Great Clifton

Ulverston West

Corby and Hayton

References

2017
2017 English local elections
2010s in Cumbria